Illyus & Barrientos are an electronic music duo from Glasgow consisting of Illyus Brown & Ivan Hall Barrientos.

Biography 
The duo met through the recommendation of Glasgow Underground Recordings owner, Kevin McKay (musician) - soon releasing their debut EP entitled 'Do Anything You Wanna' on the same record label. The lead track was instantly picked up by BBC Radio 1's Sarah-Jane Crawford and subsequently made as her 'record of the week'. After gathering support of major BBC Radio 1 DJs such as Annie Mac, Pete Tong and Skream, one half of the duo was featured on Tong's show as part of the 'Future Stars' segment. Shortly after their release on Love & Other entitled 'Ballin', they were heavily featured across various shows on BBC Radio 1, including mixes for Annie Mac, Pete Tong, Annie Nightingale, Skream, B.Traits and MistaJam. Since then, the pair have released music on Toolroom Records, Suara Music and Exploited Records.

Discography

Extended plays

Singles

Remixes

References

External links 
 Home page

Scottish DJs
Scottish house music groups
Scottish musical duos
Male musical duos
Electronic dance music duos
Musical groups from Glasgow